The – split is a vowel split that occurs mainly in Southern English in England (including Received Pronunciation), Australian English, New Zealand English, Indian English, South African English and to a lesser extent in some Welsh English as well as older Northeastern New England English by which the Early Modern English phoneme  was lengthened in certain environments and ultimately merged with the long  of . In that context, the lengthened vowel in words such as bath, laugh, grass and  chance in accents affected by the split is referred to as a broad A (also called in Britain long A). A trap–bath split also occurs in the accents of the Middle Atlantic United States (New York City, Baltimore, and Philadelphia accents), but it results in very different vowel qualities to the aforementioned British-type split. To avoid confusion, the Middle Atlantic American split is usually referred to in American linguistics as a 'short-a split'.

That led to RP  for path,  for sample etc. The sound change did not occur before other consonants and so accents affected by the split preserve  in words like cat. (See the section below for more details on the words affected.) The lengthening of the bath vowel began in the 17th century but was "stigmatised as a Cockneyism until well into the 19th century". However, since the late 19th century, it has been embraced as a feature of upper-class Received Pronunciation.

British accents

The presence or absence of this split is one of the most noticeable differences between different accents of England. An isogloss runs across the Midlands from the Wash to the Welsh border, passing to the south of the cities of Birmingham and Leicester. North of the isogloss, the vowel in most of the affected words is usually the same short-a as in cat; south of the isogloss, the vowel in the affected words is generally long.

There is some variation close to the isogloss; for example in the dialect of Birmingham (the so-called 'Brummie') most of the affected words have a short-a, but aunt and laugh usually have long vowels. Additionally, some words which have  in most forms of American English, including half, calf, rather, can't and shan't, are usually found with long vowels in the Midlands and Northern England. The split is also variable in Welsh English, often correlated with social status. On the other hand, the split may be completely absent in other varieties like Abercraf English.

John Wells has claimed that Northerners who have high social status may have a trap–bath split and has posted on his blog that he grew up with the split in Upholland, Lancashire. AF Gupta's study of students at the University of Leeds found that (on splitting the country in two halves) 93% of northerners used  in the word 'bath' and 96% of southerners used . However, there are areas of the Midlands where the two variants co-exist and, once these are excluded, there were very few individuals in the north who had a trap–bath split (or in the south who did not have the split). Gupta writes, 'There is no justification for the claims by Wells and Mugglestone that this is a sociolinguistic variable in the north, though it is a sociolinguistic variable on the areas on the border [the isogloss between north and south]'.

In Multicultural London English,  sometimes merges with  but the preceding vowel remains unchanged. That leads to the homophony between bath and path on the one hand and Bart and part on the other. That is not categorical, and th-fronting may occur instead and so bath and path can be  and  instead, as in Cockney.

In Received Pronunciation
In Received Pronunciation (RP), the trap–bath split did not happen in all eligible words. It is hard to find a clear rule for the ones that changed. Roughly, the more common a word, the more likely that its vowel changed from flat  to broad . It also looks as if monosyllables were more likely to change than polysyllables. Thus, for example, passing is closely derived from pass and so has broad A , while passage is not so closely derived and so has flat A . Here is the set of words that underwent transition and counterexamples with the same environment:

The split created a handful of minimal pairs, such as ant–aunt, caff–calf, cant–can't, have–halve, and staph-staff. There also are some near-minimal pairs, such as ample–sample. In accents with th-fronting (such as cockney), there are additional minimal pairs such as baff–bath and hath–half, and, in accents with th-stopping (which occurs variably in Multicultural London English), there are other minimal pairs such as bat–bath, lat–lath (with lat meaning 'latitude') and pat–path. In addition, the h-dropping in cockney creates more minimal pairs such as aff–half (with aff meaning affirmative) and asp–hasp.

For the words in the last row, subsequent sound changes have altered the conditions initially responsible for lengthening.

There are some words in which both pronunciations are heard among southern speakers:

 the words Basque, bastard, chaff, dastard, Glasgow, graph, lather, masquerade, pasteurise, plaque, stance
 Greek elements as in telegraph, blastocyst, chloroplast
 words with the prefix trans-

While graph, telegraph, photograph can have either form (in Received Pronunciation, they now have broad A), graphic and permutations always have a flat A.

Broad A fluctuates in dialects that include it; before s it is a more common alternative when in its common voiceless variant ( rather than ) (in transfer , transport  and variants) than when it is voiced (thus translate , trans-Atlantic ).

Social attitudes
Some research has concluded that many people in Northern England dislike the  vowel in bath words. Writing on a Labovian study of speech in West Yorkshire, K. M. Petyt stated in 1985 that several respondents 'positively said that they did not prefer the long-vowel form or that they really detested it or even that it was incorrect'. However, Joan Beal said in a 1989 review of Petyt's work that those who disliked the pronunciation still associated it with the BBC and with the sort of professional positions to which they would aspire.

Southern Hemisphere accents
Evidence for the date of the shift comes from the Southern Hemisphere accents in Australia, New Zealand, and South Africa.

In Australian English, there is generally agreement with Southern England in words like path, laugh, class. In Australia, there is variation in the word castle, both pronunciations being commonly heard. For more information, see the table at Variation in Australian English. In South Australian English, the broad A is usually used.

South African English and New Zealand English have a sound distribution similar to that of Received Pronunciation.

North American accents
Most accents of American English and Canadian English are unaffected by the split. The main exceptions are in extinct or older accents of eastern New England (including the early-20th-century Boston accent) and possibly the Plantation South, particularly Tidewater Virginia, where the broad sound was used in some of the same words, though usually a smaller number, as in Southern England, such as aunt, ask, bath. (Aunt alone still commonly uses the  vowel in New England and Virginia.) By the early 1980s, the broad  was in decline in New England.

Related but distinct phenomena include the following:

In North American English, the non-front realization of continental  in loanwords such as pasta  (cf. British ) is not an example of the trap-bath split because the vast majority of North American English accents do not feature the split in native words. Furthermore, the  realization occurs regardless of the phonetic environment, even in those environments where the lengthening did not take place in the south of England, such as before a bare final  in the German surname Mann  (cf. British , homophonous with the native word man).

Notes

References

Splits and mergers in English phonology